The archdeacons in the Church of England are senior Anglican clergy who serve under their dioceses' bishops, usually with responsibility for the area's church buildings and pastoral care for clergy. , there are 134 archdeacons (including vacancies): two archdeacons are in a job-share, five archdeacons hold two archdeaconries each, while seven hold no territorial archdeaconry.

Archdeacons

Acting archdeacons

See also
List of bishops in the Church of England
List of deans in the Church of England
List of Church of England dioceses
List of archdeacons in the Church in Wales

Resignations and retirements

Notes

References

Church of England lists